Art Hamilton (born January 19, 1948) is an American politician who served in the Arizona House of Representatives from the 22nd district from 1973 to 1999.

References

1948 births
Living people
Democratic Party members of the Arizona House of Representatives